Pondok Modern Darussalam Gontor Ponorogo, also known as Pondok Modern Gontor, or abbreviated as PMDG, or simply Pesantren Gontor, is a pesantren (boarding school style Islamic seminary) in Ponorogo Regency, East Java, Indonesia. Since its founding in 1926, the pesantren has become famous for the application of discipline, heavy emphasis of foreign languages (Arabic and English), and strong network and cadre of alumni. It also has been an educational institution known for not specifically tied to any political and social organization. The pesantren is considered a backbone of Muslim society in Indonesia, producing numerous leading figures of the history of Islam in Indonesia.

History

Pondok Tegalsari
The forerunner of Pondok Modern Darussalam Gontor began in the 18th century when Kyai Ageng Hasan Besari established Pondok Tegalsari in Jetis Ponorogo village of East Java (10 km to the south of the city of Ponorogo). Pondok Tegalsari was well known in its time and visited by thousands of santris (students of pesantren) from various regions in the archipelago. The leadership of the pondok lasted for six generations. In the mid-19th century, during the time of Kyai Hasan Khalifah, Pondok Tegalsari began to decline. At that time, the pondok had a renowned santri named R.M. Sulaiman Djamaluddin, a descendant of the royal family based in Keraton Kasepuhan of Cirebon. Kyai Hasan Khalifah then arranged the marriage of his youngest daughter Oemijatin (known as Nyai Sulaiman) with Sulaiman and they were given the task of establishing a new pesantren and the reformation of the pondok, which in later became a pesantren known as Pondok Gontor Lama.

Pondok Gontor Lama
Supported by 40 santris brought from Pondok Tegalsari, Kyai R.M. Sulaiman Djamaluddin and his wife founded Pondok Gontor Lama in a place located ±3 km east of Tegalsari and 11 km to the southeast from the city of Ponorogo. At that time, Gontor was still covered in forest and was often used as a hideout for robbers, criminals, and rogues. The third generation leader of the pondok Kyai Santoso Anom Besari was married to Rr. Sudarmi, the offspring of R.M. Sosrodiningrat (the regent of Madiun). Kyai Santoso Anom died in 1918 at a young age and left 7 children, thus the leadership of Pondok Gontor Lama was cut off. Three of the seven sons and daughters of the Kyai eventually went on to revive the pondok by updating and improving their system and curriculum.

Pondok Modern Darussalam Gontor
After studying at various traditional pesantrens and modern educational institutions, the three sons of Kyai Santoso Anom finally returned to Gontor and on September 20, 1926 (12 Rabiul Awwal 1345) for the commemoration of the Islamic Prophet Muhammad. There they pledged the establishment of Pondok Modern Darussalam Gontor (PMDG). All three were known as Trimurti Founders of Pondok Modern Darussalam Gontor, namely Ahmad Sahal, Zainudin Fananie, and Imam Zarkasyi. On October 12, 1958 (28 Rabi'ul Awwal 1378), Trimurti donated PMDG to the ummah, which was deemed highly as a sacrifice of private property for the benefit of the society. The recipient of the mandate was represented by 15 members of Gontor alumni (IKPM) who later came to consist the Waqf Board of PMDG.

Organization and administration

Waqf Board
The highest institution in the educational committee of PMDG is the Waqf Board. The board is a  15-member legislative body, responsible for all the governance including the implementation and development of the education in PMDG. Members of the board consist of PMDG alumni who are elected every 5 years.

Leadership
For daily duties and obligations, the mandate is run by the leadership of PMDG. The leadership of PMDG is the executive body instituted after the death of the founders, chosen by the Waqf Board every 5 years. The chairman of pondok is a mandate of the Waqf Board who possesses the authority to execute the decisions of the board and takes its responsibility. PMDG leaders, in addition to leading the institutions and sections in the educational committee, are also obliged to take care of the santris in accordance with the Sunnah.

In his first trial in 1985, after the Trimurti, the Waqf Board established three chiefs of Pondok to lead the post-Trimurti governance of the pesantren. All three are Shoiman Luqmanul Hakim, Abdullah Syukri Zarkasyi, and Hasan Abdullah Sahal. In 1999, with the death of Shoiman Luqmanul Hakim, the Waqf Board appointed Imam Badri as his successor. In 2006, with the death of Imam Badri, he was succeeded by Syamsul Hadi Abdan. In 2020, with the death of Syamsul Hadi Abdan and Abdullah Syukri Zarkasyi, the Waqf board appointed Amal Fathullah Zarkasyi and Akrim Mariyat as their successors. Currently, the leadership of PMDG is held by Hasan Abdullah Sahal (since 1985), Amal Fathullah Zarkasyi (since 2020) and Akrim Mariyat (since 2020).

Educational institution

Kulliyatul Mu'allimin / Mu'allimat Al-Islamiyyah

Kulliyatul Mu'allimin Al-Islamiyyah (KMI) is an educational institution for male santris, with a learning period of 4 to 6 years, covering the secondary educational level. KMI was established on 19 December 1936, after the 10 years anniversary of PMDG. There is also Kulliyatul Mu'allimat Al-Islamiyyah Pondok Gontor Putri which is the equivalent of KMI for female santris. According to the decision of the Waqf Board, on 7 Rabiul Awwal 1411, KMI Gontor Putri was officially established in Mantingan, Ngawi Regency. This pesantren for women is 100 km from the main area of PMDG. The curriculum and learning program of Gontor Putri is similar to KMI, with adjustments to local content and emphasis on training specifically for female santris.

University of Darussalam
The University of Darussalam (UNIDA) is a pesantren college where all the students are in campus dormitories under the guidance of the rector (as kyai). UNIDA was established on 17 November 1963 (1 Rajab 1383) by Trimurti and managed under the Waqf Board. Currently, Amal Fathullah Zarkasyi serves as the rector. Below are the faculties and its courses existing under UNIDA:

Faculty of Ushuluddin: Comparative religion, Aqeedah and Islamic philosophy, Qur'anic tafsir
Faculty of Tarbiyah: Islamic religious education, Arabic language education
Faculty of Sharia: Comparative law, Islamic economic jurisprudence
Faculty of Economics and Management: Islamic economics, Business management
Faculty of Humanities: International relations, Communication studies
Faculty of Health Sciences: Pharmacy, Nutrition, Occupational safety and health
Faculty of Science and Technology: Informatics engineering, Agrotechnology, Agricultural industrial technology

Academics

Orientation
The scholarly orientation at PMDG is aimed at forming a person with devout Islamic faith and morals and can serve the community at the same time. PMDG proclaimed that "education is more important than teaching". There are four major outlines of the direction and purpose of education at PMDG, which are the education for community, simplicity, no partying, and demanding knowledge of God. As a modern pesantren, the curriculum of PMDG covers both traditional Islamic educational and the secular educational materials.

Foreign partnerships
Pondok Modern Darussalam Gontor aims to reflect the leading international Islamic educational institutions, and it has established partnerships with the four educational institutions which heavily influenced the school orientation. The main partnership is with Al-Azhar University of Cairo, Egypt, which has a vast waqf and scholarly resources, which able to send scholars across the world and provide scholarships for thousands of students from various parts of the world to study at the university. The others institutions are Aligarh Muslim University in India, Shanggit in Mauritania, and Santiniketan in India.

Notable alumni
Abu Bakar Bashir - the leader of Jamaah Ansharut Tauhid
Ahmad Fuadi - novelist
Bachtiar Nasir - da'i
Din Syamsuddin - the 14th chairman of Muhammadiyah and the 6th chairman of Majelis Ulama Indonesia
Emha Ainun Nadjib - poet and Islamic intellectual
Hasanain Juaini - environmentalist and the winner of Ramon Magsaysay Award
Hasyim Muzadi - the 4th chairman of Nahdlatul Ulama
Hidayat Nur Wahid - the speaker of the People's Consultative Assembly during 2004–2009, and the leader of Prosperous Justice Party during 2000-2004
Idham Chalid - the 2nd chairman of Nahdlatul Ulama, National Hero of Indonesia
Lukman Hakim Saifuddin - the incumbent Minister of Religious Affairs
Mohammad Idris - the 3rd mayor of Depok
Muhammad Muzammil Basyuni - the ambassador to Syria served during the Yudhoyono administration
Nurcholish Madjid - highly influential Islamic intellectual

References

Bibliography
 
 

Pesantren in Indonesia
1926 establishments in the Dutch East Indies
Educational institutions established in 1926
Islam in East Java
Islamic universities and colleges in Indonesia
Universities in Indonesia
Private universities and colleges in Indonesia